Kippenberger is a German surname. Notable people with the surname include:

 Christopher Kippenberger (born 1977), German/American filmmaker/artist 
 Howard Kippenberger (1897–1957), New Zealand soldier
 Karl Kippenberger (born 1973), New Zealand bass guitarist of the band Shihad
 Martin Kippenberger (1953–1997), German artist 
 Susanne Kippenberger (born 1957), German journalists and writer

German-language surnames

de:Kippenberger
fr:Kippenberger